Kryovrysi (meaning cold spring) is a village in the municipal unit of Perama, Ioannina regional unit, Greece. It is in the southeastern part of the Mitsikeli mountains, at the southeastern edge of the Zagori region. In 2011 its population was 63 people. Kryovrysi is 2.5 km north of Spothoi, 9 km east of Perama and 8 km northeast of Ioannina.

Population

History

In the area, a section of the ancient Via Egnatia that ran from Mazia to Baldouma has been preserved. The chapel of Agioi Anargyroi and the bridge near the locality Kamper-Aga date back to Ottoman rule.

See also

List of settlements in the Ioannina regional unit

External links
Kryovrysi at the GTP Travel Pages

References

Populated places in Ioannina (regional unit)